Uncial 0148 (in the Gregory-Aland numbering), ε 51 (Soden), is a Greek uncial manuscript of the New Testament. It is dated paleographically to the 8th-century.

Description 
The codex contains a small part of the Gospel of Matthew 28:5-19, on one parchment leaf (21.5 cm by 16.5 cm). The text is written in two columns per page, 24 lines per page, in large uncial letters. 

The Greek text of this codex is mixed. Aland placed it in Category III.

Currently it is dated by the INTF to the 8th-century.

The codex currently is located at the Österreichische Nationalbibliothek (Gr. 106), in Vienna.

See also 

 List of New Testament uncials
 Textual criticism

References 

Greek New Testament uncials
8th-century biblical manuscripts
Biblical manuscripts of the Austrian National Library